Frederick Warren Cozens (November 17, 1890 – January 2, 1954) was an American college basketball, football, and boxing coach. He was the first head coach of both basketball and football at UCLA and served as the school's athletic director from 1919 to 1942.

Cozens was born in Portland, Oregon in 1890.  His father, Frederick Cozens (born 1849), was emigrated from England in 1870 and became a salesman at a hardware store in Portland.  His mother Carrie E. (Beharrell) Cozens was born in Indiana in 1858.  Cozens had an older sister, Ella M. Cozens, born in 1884.  He received bachelor's and master's degrees from the University of California in 1915 and 1918, respectively, and a Ph.D. at the University of Oregon in 1928.

Cozens was employed by the University of California for nearly 40 years.   He began as a teaching fellow and physical education instructor at Berkeley from 1915 to 1919.  In June 1917, he was employed as an instructor of physical education at the University of California at Berkeley, California.

In 1919, Cozens moved to the Southern Branch of the University of California, now known as UCLA, where he served as the Director of Physical Education and Athletics and professor of physical education from 1919 to 1942.   He became the first head coach of the Southern Branch men's basketball and football teams in 1919. Cozens remained the Southern Branch's basketball coach through 1921 and guided them to a 20–4 record. His Southern Branch football teams compiled a 2–6 record. The Southern Branch did not participate in an athletic conference until 1920, so the 1919 football team played a schedule full of local high schools and other assorted teams.

In 1932, Cozens was inducted into the National Academy of Kinesiology (formerly the American Academy of Physical Education) as Fellow #32.  Cozens also served as the dean of UCLA's college of Applied Arts from 1939 to 1942.

At the time of the 1920 United States Census, Cozens was living in Los Angeles with his wife Helen J. Cozens and one-and-a-half year old son, Federick K. Cozens.  Cozens' occupation was recorded as a professor at a university.  At the time of the 1930 United States Census, Cozens was still living in Los Angeles with his wife, Helen.  The couple had two sons, Frederick K. and James B. Cozens.  Cozens' occupation was again listed as a professor at a university.

Cozens returned to Berkeley in 1942 and served as a professor and director of physical education from 1942 to 1954. Cozens died in 1954 in Berkeley.

Head coaching record

Football

Basketball

References

1890 births
1954 deaths
Basketball coaches from Oregon
UCLA Bruins athletic directors
UCLA Bruins baseball coaches
UCLA Bruins football coaches
UCLA Bruins men's basketball coaches
University of California, Berkeley alumni
University of California, Berkeley faculty
University of Oregon alumni
Sportspeople from Portland, Oregon